Andrés Martín Rodríguez (born 5 March 1949) is a Spanish boxer. He competed in the men's featherweight event at the 1968 Summer Olympics.

References

External links
 

1949 births
Living people
Spanish male boxers
Olympic boxers of Spain
Boxers at the 1968 Summer Olympics
Sportspeople from Madrid
Featherweight boxers